Bikram Singh is an Indian politician and member of the Bharatiya Janata Party. Singh is a member of the Himachal Pradesh Legislative Assembly and represents the Jaswan-Pragpur (Vidhan Sabha constituency). Singh is the Industry Minister in the Himachal Pradesh Government.

References

Living people
Himachal Pradesh MLAs 2017–2022
Year of birth missing (living people)
Bharatiya Janata Party politicians from Himachal Pradesh